Yelda Reynaud (born Kaymakçı on 17 January 1972) is a Turkish-Austrian actress.

Filmography

Television

References

External links 

1972 births
Austrian people of Turkish descent
Austrian film actresses
Turkish film actresses
Living people
Turkish television actresses
Actresses from Vienna
20th-century Turkish actresses
Best Actress Golden Orange Award winners